Haslen may refer to

 Haslen, Appenzell Innerrhoden, a village in the Swiss canton of Appenzell Innerrhoden
 Haslen, Glarus, a village in the Swiss canton of Glarus